Conus tulipa, common name the tulip cone, is a species of sea snail, a marine gastropod mollusk in the family Conidae, the cone snails and their allies.

Like all species within the genus Conus, these snails are predatory and venomous. They are capable of "stinging" humans, therefore live ones should be handled carefully.

A class of conopeptides named rho-TIA was discovered in Conus tulipa in 2001. This class of conopetides targets (react with) alpha1-adrenergic receptors.

Description
The size of the shell varies between 45 mm and 95 mm. The shell is variegated with violet and white, clouded with chestnut, with numerous revolving rows of minute chestnut and white articulations. The interior of the aperture is violaceous.

Conantokin-T is a toxin derived from the venom of Conus tulipa.

Distribution
The marine species occurs in the Indo-Western Pacific.
 Madagascar
 Mauritius
 Tanzania
 India
 the Philippines
 Queensland (Australia)

Feeding habits 
Conus tulipa preys on fishes.

References

 Linnaeus, C. (1758). Systema Naturae per regna tria naturae, secundum classes, ordines, genera, species, cum characteribus, differentiis, synonymis, locis. Editio decima, reformata. Laurentius Salvius: Holmiae. ii, 824 pp 
 Röding, P.F. 1798. Museum Boltenianum sive Catalogus cimeliorum e tribus regnis naturae quae olim collegerat Joa. Hamburg : Trappii 199 pp. 
 Swainson, W. 1840. A Treatise on Malacology or the Natural Classification of Shells and Shell-fish. London : Longman, Brown, Green & Longmans 419 pp.
 Reeve, L.A. 1843. Monograph of the genus Conus. pls 1–39 in Reeve, L.A. (ed.). Conchologica Iconica. London : L. Reeve & Co. Vol. 1.
 Adams, H. 1868. Descriptions of some new species of shells collected by Geoffrey Nevill, Esq. at Mauritius, the Isle of Bourbon, and the Seychelles. Proceedings of the Zoological Society of London 1868: 288–292, pl. 28
 Demond, J. 1957. Micronesian reef associated gastropods. Pacific Science 11(3): 275–341, fig. 2, pl. 1
 Gillett, K. & McNeill, F. 1959. The Great Barrier Reef and Adjacent Isles: a comprehensive survey for visitor, naturalist and photographer. Sydney : Coral Press 209 pp. 
 Wilson, B.R. & Gillett, K. 1971. Australian Shells: illustrating and describing 600 species of marine gastropods found in Australian waters. Sydney : Reed Books 168 pp.
 Salvat, B. & Rives, C. 1975. Coquillages de Polynésie. Tahiti : Papéete Les editions du pacifique, pp. 1–391.
 Cernohorsky, W.O. 1978. Tropical Pacific Marine Shells. Sydney : Pacific Publications 352 pp., 68 pls.
 Wilson, B. 1994. Australian Marine Shells. Prosobranch Gastropods. Kallaroo, WA : Odyssey Publishing Vol. 2 370 pp. 
 Röckel, D., Korn, W. & Kohn, A.J. 1995. Manual of the Living Conidae. Volume 1: Indo-Pacific Region. Wiesbaden : Hemmen 517 pp.

External links
 The Conus Biodiversity website
 Cone Shells - Knights of the Sea
 

tulipa
Gastropods described in 1758
Taxa named by Carl Linnaeus